Aeranthes arachnites is an orchid native to the Mascarene Islands of the Indian Ocean (Mauritius, Réunion and Rodrigues).

References 

arachnites
Orchids of Africa
Orchids of Réunion
Orchids of Mauritius
Plants described in 1822